Hellinsia malesanus is a moth of the family Pterophoridae. It is found in Peru.

The wingspan is 19 mm. The forewings are whitish‑pale brown. The hindwings and fringes are brown‑grey. Adults are on wing in July and August, at altitudes ranging from 150 to 2,000
meters.

References

Moths described in 1921
malesanus
Moths of South America